Hugo Daini (14 July 1919 – 26 December 1976) was an Italian sculptor. In World War II he served as a paratrooper and subsequently graduated. In 1948 he received a scholarship from the Italian NOC CONI and his work was part of the sculpture event in the art competition at the 1948 Summer Olympics. He moved to Venezuela in 1949 where he became well known. He created a number of major works in Caracas, including the statues for the facade of the Palacio Blanco in 1956, and a number of statues, reliefs and fountains for the Paseo los Próceres (Boulevard for the National Heroes) in 1957. Daini’s works for public spaces were initially influenced by Cubism, his later small figures more by Expressionism. He sculpted several monuments showing the Liberator Simon Bolivar, including the bronze statue at Belgrave Square, London. His daughter Rita (1954) and his son Rudy (1951) also became artists.

References

External links
 

1919 births
1976 deaths
20th-century Italian sculptors
20th-century Italian male artists
Italian male sculptors
Olympic competitors in art competitions
Artists from Rome